Kansas City jazz is a style of jazz that developed in Kansas City, Missouri during the 1920s and 1930s, which marked the transition from the structured big band style to the much more improvisational style of bebop. The hard-swinging, bluesy transition style is bracketed by Count Basie, who in 1929 signed with Bennie Moten's Kansas City Orchestra, and Kansas City native Charlie Parker, who ushered in the bebop style in America. It has been said that while New Orleans was the birthplace of jazz, "America's music" grew up in Kansas City.

Thus, Kansas City is known as one of the most popular "cradles of jazz". Other cities include New Orleans, Chicago, St. Louis, Pittsburgh, Philadelphia, and New York City. Kansas City was known for the organized musicians of the Local 627 A.F.M., which controlled a number of venues in the city.

Background
The first band from Kansas City to acquire a national reputation was the Coon-Sanders Original Nighthawk Orchestra, a white group which broadcast nationally in the 1920s. However, the Kansas City jazz school is identified with the black bands of the 1920s and 1930s, including those led by Bennie Moten, Andy Kirk, Harlan Leonard, George E. Lee, Count Basie, and Jay McShann.

Kansas City in the 1930s was very much the crossroads of the United States resulting in a mix of cultures. Transcontinental trips at the time, whether by plane or train, often necessitated a stop in the city. The era marked the zenith of power of political boss Tom Pendergast. Kansas City was a wide open town with liquor laws and hours totally ignored and was called the new Storyville. Most of the jazz musicians associated with the style were born in other places but got caught up in the friendly musical competitions among performers that could keep a single song being performed in variations for an entire night. Often members of the big bands would perform at regular venues earlier in the evening and go to the jazz clubs later to jam for the rest of the night.

Jay McShann told the Associated Press in 2003:
You'd hear some cat play, and somebody would say "This cat, he sounds like he is from Kansas City." It was Kansas City Style. They knew it on the East Coast. They knew it on the West Coast. They knew it up North and they knew it down South. 

Claude "Fiddler" Williams described the scene:
Kansas City was different from all other places because we'd be jamming all night. And [if] you come up here ... playing the wrong thing, we'd straighten you out. 

Clubs were scattered throughout city but the most fertile area was the inner city neighborhood of 18th Street and Vine.

Among the clubs were the Amos 'n' Andy, Boulevard Lounge, Cherry Blossom, Chesterfield Club, Chocolate Bar, Dante's Inferno, Elk's Rest, Hawaiian Gardens, Hell's Kitchen, the Hi Hat, the Hey Hay Club, Lone Star, Old Kentucky Bar-B-Que, Paseo Ballroom, Pla-Mor Ballroom, Reno Club, Spinning Wheel, Street's Blue Room, Subway, and Sunsetx.

Kansas City influence overtly transferred to the national scene in 1936 when record producer John Hammond discovered Count Basie on his car radio. Pendergast was convicted of income tax fraud in 1940 and the city cracked down on the clubs effectively ending the era.

Style
Kansas City jazz is distinguished by the following musical elements:

 A preference for a 4 feel (walking) over the 2 beat feel found in other jazz styles of the time. This gave Kansas City jazz a more relaxed, fluid sound than previous jazz styles.
 Extended soloing. Fueled by the non-stop nightlife under political boss Tom Pendergast, Kansas City jam sessions continued until later than sunrise, fostering a highly competitive atmosphere and a unique jazz culture in which the goal was to "say something" with one's instrument, rather than simply show off one's technique. It was not uncommon for one "song" to be performed for several hours, with the best musicians often soloing for dozens of choruses at a time.
 So-called "head arrangements". The KC big bands often played by memory, composing and arranging the music collectively, rather than sight-reading as other big bands of the time did. This further contributed to the loose, spontaneous Kansas City sound.
 A heavy blues influence, with KC songs often based around a 12-bar blues structure, rather than the 32-bar AABA standard (although Moten Swing is in this AABA format).
 One of the most recognizable characteristics of Kansas City jazz is frequent, elaborate riffing by the different sections. Riffs were often created  - or even improvised - collectively, and took many forms: a) one section riffing alone, serving as the main focus of the music; b) one section riffing behind a soloist, adding excitement to the song; or c) two or more sections riffing in counterpoint, creating a rousing, complex sound. The Count Basie signature tunes "One O'Clock Jump" and "Jumpin' at the Woodside", for example, are mainly collections of riffs, memorized in a head arrangement, and punctuated with solos. Glenn Miller's famous swing anthem "In the Mood" closely follows this Kansas City pattern of riffing sections, perhaps exemplifying how, by the late 1930s, the style had gone on to influence the larger musical world.

Aftermath
Each year Kansas City celebrates "Jazzoo" - a charity fundraiser dedicated to Kansas City jazz and raising funds for the Kansas City Zoo. In 2011, Jazzoo was one of the Nation's largest charity fundraisers, raising over $800,000.

Musicians

Selected discography
Early jazz and swing era music:
Various artists, The Real Kansas City of the 20's, 30's & 40's, Columbia/Legacy (1996)
Various artists, Jazz - Kansas City Style, Topaz Jazz/Pearl (1996)
Various artists, The Cradle of Jazz, The International Music Co. (2000) 2CD
Various artists, Kansas City Jazz 1924-1942, Frémeaux & Associés [France] (2005) 2CD

Bibliography
 Frank Driggs and Chuck Haddix, Kansas City Jazz: From Ragtime to Bebop--A History New York: Oxford University Press, 2006, 
 Haddix, Chuck. Rags to Be-bop: the Sounds of Kansas City Music, 1890-1945. [Text by] Chuck Haddix. Kansas City, Mo.: University of Missouri at Kansas City, University Libraries, Marr Sound Archives, 1991. Without ISBN
 Nathan W. Pearson, Jr., Goin' to Kansas City. Urbana, Il.: University of Illinois Press, 1988, 
 Nathan W. Pearson, Jr., Political and Musical Forces That Influenced the Development of Kansas City Jazz. In: Black Music Research Journal Vol. 9 (2), (1989), pp. 181–192
 Ross Russell, Jazz Style in Kansas City and the Southwest, University of California Press, Berkeley, 1971, 
 Gunther Schuller, The Swing Era: The Development of Jazz, 1930-1945 (The History of Jazz, Vol. 2), New York: Oxford University Press, 1991

References

Kansas City metropolitan area
Music of Kansas City, Missouri
Jazz genres
History of Kansas City
American jazz